Nina's Heavenly Delights is a 2006 British drama romance comedy film, directed by Pratibha Parmar. The film was released on 29 September 2006 in the United Kingdom, and on 21 November 2007 in the United States.

Synopsis
When young Glaswegian cook Nina Shah (Shelley Conn) returns home for her father's funeral after three estranged years in London, England, she begins a romantic relationship with Lisa (Laura Fraser), an old childhood friend who now owns half the late father's Indian restaurant, The New Taj. Together they seek to save the restaurant by winning the national "Best in the West Curry Competition" for a third time. Nina's mother Suman (Veena Sood) and brother Kary (Atta Yaqub), however, want to sell the place to fellow restaurateur 	Raj (Art Malik), whose chef son Sanjay (Raji James) had been left at the altar by Nina. Lending the young women moral support is Nina's flamboyant gay friend Bobbi (Ronny Jhutti), and Nina's younger sister Priya (Zoe Henretty).

Cast

Shelley Conn as Nina Shah
Laura Fraser as Lisa
Art Malik as Raj
Ronny Jhutti as Bobbi
Veena Sood as Suman Shah
Atta Yaqub as Kary Shah
Zoe Henretty as Priya Shah
Raji James as Sanjay
Elaine C. Smith as Auntie Mamie
Rita Wolf as Auntie Tumi
Kathleen McDermott as Janice
Kulvinder Ghir as TV host
Tariq Mullan as Ravi
Francisco Bosch as Shriv

Critical reception 

The film gained mostly negative reviews, and received 16% on the critics score on Rotten Tomatoes. It was also a commercial flop. The film only made $267 on its opening week in the US and Canada. It grossed $50,171 worldwide.

AfterEllen said "showcasing a positive lesbian relationship while avoiding some of the typical queer film catch traps is where Nina’s Heavenly Delights succeeds....If we’re measuring ingredients by heart, this one is just right."

The New York Times said, "Diluted by menu pornography and cringeworthy dance routines, ... the movie's central romance barely qualifies as such.  'It's all about chemistry,' Nina says.  Too bad she and her co-star possess so little."

Producer Chris Atkins said it was "the worst film that I or anyone else has produced". He used the film as an example to criticise the now defunct UK Film Council. He said the film "ticked all the boxes" and, as a result, was granted £250,000 by the Film Council via Scottish Screen. Atkins said it was a "waste of public money". This was somewhat ironic as, in July 2016, Atkins was jailed for five years for defrauding HMRC in a film-finance tax scam.

Awards

Soundtrack
The film's soundtrack includes the Shelly Poole's song "Lost in You" and "Maybe That's What It Takes" by Alex Parks.

See also 
 List of LGBT-related films directed by women

References

External links
 UK official site
 US official site
 
 
 
 
 Nina's Heavenly Delight's review and Trailer at Movies For Lesbians

2006 films
2006 romantic comedy-drama films
British romantic comedy-drama films
British Indian films
British LGBT-related films
Lesbian-related films
Films set in Glasgow
Films shot in Glasgow
Cooking films
2006 comedy films
2006 drama films
2000s English-language films
2000s British films